Major General Rem Krassilnikov (Krasilnikov, (1927 - 2003) was a counter-intelligence officer of the Soviet Union's State Security Committee (KGB). 

Krasilnikov was born in the family of a senior intelligence officer. His first name was taken from the Russian phrase Revolutsia mirovaya ( -"World Revolution"). His wife's name was Ninel (Lenin spelled backwards).

During the 1980s, he was Chief of the First (American) Department within the KGB's Second Chief Directorate, which placed him in charge of investigating and disrupting the operations of the Central Intelligence Agency in Moscow. Prior to that he headed up the Second Department of the SCD, which targeted the intelligence operations of the United Kingdom.

His book "KGB protiv MI6" ("KGB Against MI6") was a bestseller in Russia, and was reissued in 2020.

References
Milt Bearden and James Risen, "The Main Enemy: The inside story of the CIA's final showdown with the KGB", Ballantine, 2003, 

1927 births
2003 deaths
KGB officers